is the fourth addition to the Yu-Gi-Oh! anime meta-series, as well as the 1st main spin-off series. The plot revolves around Jaden Yuki and his friends, and tells of their adventures at Duel Academy. The fourth season, the Nightshroud Saga, covers their graduation from the Academy. 

This is the only season of Yu-Gi-Oh! GX that has not been dubbed in English.

Episodes

References 

2007 Japanese television seasons
2008 Japanese television seasons
GX (season 4)